The Brooklyn Music School is a community school for the performing arts in the Fort Greene neighborhood of Brooklyn, New York offering in person and online programming. Founded in 1909 as the Brooklyn Music School Settlement, it owns and operates a four-story building located at 126 St. Felix Street that contains twenty-four classrooms, three dance studios, and a 266-seat Spanish Style theatre. The school is a long-standing member of the National Guild of Community Schools of the Arts.

The Brooklyn Music School Playhouse was also the home of the Little Theatre Opera company in the 1920s. From 2011 until 2018, it was the home of Science, Language & Arts International School (SLA), a French and Mandarin immersion science- and arts-based elementary school.

Muse Academy at the Brooklyn Music School was founded in 2018.

References

External links
Official website
NYC Arts Write-Up

 Brooklyn Arts Council (Brooklyn Music Playhouse). .
 Little Theatre Opera (San Jose News). .
 Science, Language & Arts International School (SLA). .

Music schools in New York City
Educational institutions established in 1912
Fort Greene, Brooklyn
Universities and colleges in Brooklyn
1912 establishments in New York City